Zašto da ne! (Why Not!) is the seventh studio album by Serbian/Yugoslav band Električni orgazam. It was released in 1994 by PGP RTS. It is the band's first double album.

Track listing
Lyrics by Petrović (tracks: A3, D5), Čavajda (tracks: A2, D5), Gojković (tracks: A1 to C4, C6 to D6), Todorović (A3) and Radomirović (C5). Music by Petrović (tracks: A4, A5, B3, B4, C2 to C4, D3, D5, D6), Čavajda (tracks: C5, D5), Gojković (tracks: A1 to B3, B5 to C4, C6 to D6) and Zagorčić (B4). Arranged by Petrović (tracks: A1, A3 to B1, B3 to B5, C1 to C4, C6 to D6), Čavajda (tracks: A2, C5, D5), Gojković (tracks: A1 to C1, C3, C4, C6 to D6), Todorović (tracks: A2, A3), Radomirović (tracks: B2, B4, C1, C2, D1) and Zagorčić (B4).

"A" Side
	 	"Keine Macht Den Drogen" (flute – Nenad Čanak, vocals (refrain) – Nenad Racković)
	 	"I. D. J. S."
	 	"Nikog više ne čekam" (saxophone – Neša Petrović)
	 	"Ja sam sasvim normalan"
	 	"Zašto da ne"

"B" Side
 		"Kažu da te vratim mami"
	 	"Daj mi sklonište" (vocals – Manja, Cane)
	 	"Ovaj put je tvoj" (flute – Nenad Čanak, violin – Štukelja)
	 	"Dajem ljubav"
	 	"Spojimo se sad" (saxophone – Neša Petrović)
	 	"Prljava mala devojčica"

"C" Side
	 	"Moj život je paranoja" (vocals – Cane)
	 	"Oslobodi se (U krugu svetlosti)"
	 	"Da si tako jaka"
	 	"A ti me opet zoveš"
	 	"Škloke ploke flonge"
	 	"Rasipam se"

"D" Side
	 	"Metadonska terapija"
	 	"Prestani" (vocals [refrain] – Manja, Cane)
	 	"Jak kao kamen"
	 	"Halucinacije"
	 	"Huni i Avari naviru"
	 	"Sijaj sad kao novo Sunce"

Personnel
Švaba (Zoran Radomirović) — bass guitar, vocals
Čavke (Goran Čavajda) — drums, didgeridoo, vocals
Banana (Branislav Petrović) — guitar, vocals, organ, piano, violin, xylophone
Srđan Gojković "Gile" — vocals, guitar
Srđan Todorović "Žika" — drums, percussion, tambourine 
Dejan Radisavljević "Role" — guitar (tracks: A4, B1, C3, C4, C6, D3)
Zoran Zagorčić — organ, piano (tracks: B2, B4, B5, C1, C4, D2 to D4)

External links
Zašto da ne! at Discogs

References

Električni Orgazam albums
1994 albums
PGP-RTS albums